The 'Alampur Beneshan' mango, sometimes spelled Banishan, is a named mango cultivar that originates from India. In southern India, it is sometimes known as Seeri. It differs from, but is related ancestrally to, the high-volume commercial cultivar Banganapalli. However, this is a much older and prized cultivar.

Description
The fruit is medium-sized with thin skin, ranging in color from green to yellow. The flesh of the ripe fruit is fiberless, ranging in color from yellow to golden-yellow to orange-yellow. Many Indian strains stay green even on ripening, though a slight yellowing or blush is often noted near the stalk. The pores in the skin have a distinct whitish coloration. There is no distinct bouquet from the ripe fruit, but the flesh has a deep, slightly tart flavor with slight accents of cinnamon, pepper, jackfruit and other Indian mango cultivars like Alphonso.

See also
 List of mango cultivars

References

Flora of Florida
Flora of India (region)
Mango cultivars of India